Vince Taylor (born August 25, 1956) is a Retired American IFBB professional bodybuilder.

Background
Taylor won 22 IFBB titles during his career, a Guinness world record until it was surpassed by eight time Mr. Olympia Ronnie Coleman with 26 wins.

Taylor holds the record for the most Masters Olympia titles with six (1996, 1997, 1998, 1999-2001)

A bodybuilding icon and legend, he made a comeback to the sport at the age of 50 by competing in the 2006 Australian Pro, where he placed 3rd. 
He then went on to the 2006 Mr. Olympia, placing 11th.

He took 10th place at the 2007 Arnold Classic in a very competitive field. He signed on to compete at the Australian Pro in 2007. Taylor also appeared in several training videotapes, such as "Vince Taylor Workout - "Getting Pumped"" and "Beyond the Masters."

He resides in Pembroke Pines, Florida.

Physique statistics
 Height:  5 ft 9 in
 Off Season Weight: 250 lb
 Competition Weight: 230 lb

Competition history
 2007 Arnold Classic, 10th
 2007 Australian Pro, 3rd
 2006 Mr. Olympia - 11th
 2006 Australian Pro - 3rd
 2002 Masters Olympia - 2nd
 2001 Masters Olympia - 1st
 2000 Masters Olympia - 1st
 1999 Masters Olympia - IFBB, 1st
 1999 Arnold Classic - IFBB, 6th
 1998 Arnold Classic - IFBB, 3rd
 1998 Arnold Classic - IFBB, Masters, 1st
 1998 Masters Arnold - IFBB, Winner
 1997 Arnold Classic - IFBB, 5th
 1997 Grand Prix Czech Republic - IFBB, 7th
 1997 Grand Prix England - IFBB, 7th
 1997 Grand Prix Finland - IFBB, 6th
 1997 Grand Prix Germany - IFBB, 9th
 1997 Grand Prix Hungary - IFBB, 9th
 1997 Grand Prix Russia - IFBB, 6th
 1997 Grand Prix Spain - IFBB, 8th
 1997 Olympia - Masters - IFBB, Overall Winner
 1997 Mr. Olympia - Masters - IFBB, Masters 40+, 1st
 1996 Arnold Classic - IFBB, 4th
 1996 Grand Prix Czech Republic - IFBB, 4th
 1996 Grand Prix England - IFBB, 6th
 1996 Grand Prix Germany - IFBB, 6th
 1996 Grand Prix Russia - IFBB, 3rd
 1996 Grand Prix Spain - IFBB, 6th
 1996 Grand Prix Spain - IFBB, 7th
 1996 Grand Prix Switzerland - IFBB, 5th
 1996 Mr. Olympia - Masters - IFBB, Winner
 1996 San Jose Pro Invitational - IFBB, 3rd
 1995 Grand Prix England - IFBB, Winner
 1995 Grand Prix France - IFBB, Winner
 1995 Grand Prix Germany - IFBB, 2nd
 1995 Grand Prix Germany - IFBB, 6th
 1995 Grand Prix Russia - IFBB, 2nd
 1995 Grand Prix Spain - IFBB, 2nd
 1995 Grand Prix Ukraine - IFBB, Winner
 1995 Houston Pro Invitational - IFBB, 2nd
 1995 Niagara Falls Pro Invitational - IFBB, Winner
 1995 Night of Champions - IFBB, 2nd
 1995 Mr. Olympia - IFBB, 5th
 1994 Arnold Classic - IFBB, 2nd
 1994 Grand Prix France - IFBB, 2nd
 1994 Grand Prix Germany - IFBB, 2nd
 1994 Ironman Pro Invitational - IFBB, Winner
 1993 Arnold Classic - IFBB, 3rd
 1993 Grand Prix France - IFBB, 2nd
 1993 Grand Prix Germany - IFBB, 2nd
 1993 Ironman Pro Invitational - IFBB, 3rd
 1993 San Jose Pro Invitational - IFBB, Winner
 1992 Arnold Classic - IFBB, Winner
 1992 Ironman Pro Invitational - IFBB, Winner
 1992 Mr. Olympia - IFBB, 6th
 1992 Pittsburgh Pro Invitational - IFBB, Winner
 1991 Arnold Classic - IFBB, 3rd
 1991 Grand Prix Denmark - IFBB, Winner
 1991 Grand Prix England - IFBB, 2nd
 1991 Grand Prix Finland - IFBB, Winner
 1991 Grand Prix Italy - IFBB, Winner
 1991 Grand Prix Spain - IFBB, Winner
 1991 Grand Prix Switzerland - IFBB, Winner
 1991 Ironman Pro Invitational - IFBB, 5th
 1991 Mr. Olympia - IFBB, 3rd
 1991 Pittsburgh Pro Invitational - IFBB, Winner
 1989 Grand Prix England - IFBB, 2nd
 1989 Grand Prix Finland - IFBB, 2nd
 1989 Grand Prix Holland - IFBB, 4th
 1989 Night of Champions - IFBB, Winner
 1989 Mr. Olympia - IFBB, 3rd
 1988 Nationals - NPC, Overall Winner
 1988 Nationals - NPC, Light-HeavyWeight, 1st
 1987 Mr America - AAU, Medium, 1st
 1987 Nationals - NPC, Light-HeavyWeight, 4th
 1983 Mr. Berlin Heavy Weight - 1st

See also
List of male professional bodybuilders
List of female professional bodybuilders

References

External links
 bodybuilders.com Vince Taylor vital stats

American bodybuilders
1956 births
Living people
African-American bodybuilders
Professional bodybuilders
People from Pembroke Pines, Florida
21st-century African-American people
20th-century African-American sportspeople